The Galactic Center GeV Excess (GCE) is an unexpected surplus of gamma-ray radiation in the center of the Milky Way galaxy first detected in 2009 that is unexplained by direct observation. , this excessive (and diffused) gamma-ray radiation is not well understood by astronomers. However, astronomers have suggested that self-annihilating dark matter may be a dominant contributor to the GCE, based on analysis using non-Poissonian template fitting (NPTF) statistical methods, wavelet methods, and studies by other astronomers may support this idea. More recently, in August 2020, other astronomers have reported that self-annihilating dark matter may not be the explanation for the GCE after all. Other hypotheses include ties to a yet unseen population of millisecond pulsars  or young pulsars, burst events, the stellar population of the galactic bulge, or the Milky Way's central supermassive black hole.

Two percent of the gamma ray radiation in a 30° radius circle around the galactic center is attributed to the GCE. While some controversially argue that it might be radiation from dark matter (which is not otherwise known to radiate) or another exotic explanation, some still believe that conventional objects such as pulsars could explain the GCE.

See also

References

Further reading
 
 

Gamma-ray astronomy
Milky Way
Observational astronomy
Unsolved problems in astronomy